Shenda may be:
Shenda highway, running between Shenyang and Dalian, Liaoning, China
A colloquial name for Shenzhen University, Guangdong, China
Shenda Station, Shenzhen Metro Line 1, which is named for the university

People with the name Shenda include:
Shenda Amery, British painter